Koffi Davy Mahinde Boua (born 20 September 1986) is an Ivorian professional footballer who plays as a forward.

Career
Boua used to play for ASEC Mimosas, where he won his first trophy in his first season in Ligue 1 in 2010. He was then twice a runner up in Ligue 1 in 2012–13 and 2014–15. He left during the 2015–16 season and signed for MAS Fez, playing alongside Guiza Djédjé, who also left from the Ligue 1 in Ivory Coast.

International career

International goals
Scores and results list Ivory Coast's goal tally first, score column indicates score after each Boua goal.

Honours 
ASEC
 Ligue 1: 2010; runner-up 2012–13, 2014–15

References

External links
 

Living people
1986 births
People from Bouaké
Association football forwards
Ivorian footballers
Ivory Coast international footballers
Ligue 1 (Ivory Coast) players
Botola players
Saudi Second Division players
ASEC Mimosas players
AS Tanda players
Maghreb de Fès players
Olympic Club de Safi players
Al-Rawdhah Club players
Ivorian expatriate footballers
Expatriate footballers in Morocco
Expatriate footballers in Saudi Arabia
Ivorian expatriate sportspeople in Morocco
Ivorian expatriate sportspeople in Saudi Arabia
2016 African Nations Championship players
Ivory Coast A' international footballers